Chai Ling (born April 15, 1966) is a Chinese psychologist who was one of the student leaders in the Tiananmen Square protests of 1989. She is the founder of All Girls Allowed, an organization dedicated to ending China's one-child policy, and the founder and president of Jenzabar, an enterprise resource planning software firm for educational institutions.

Life in China
Chai was born on April 15, 1966, in Rizhao, Shandong.  Both Chai's mother and father had been doctors in the People's Liberation Army during the 1950s. Chai is the eldest of four children. In 1983, Chai Ling began her education at Peking University where she eventually earned a BA in psychology. Chai met her future husband, Feng Congde, in January 1987. She became aware of Feng after his arrest on January 1, 1987 for his participation in a democracy demonstration, and met him a few days later on her way to the university library. Chai and Feng were married in the spring of 1988, though they were forced to alter their identification because they failed to meet the age requirements to be legally married. After their wedding, Chai was accepted as a graduate student at the Child Psychology Institute of Beijing Normal University. Chai and Feng became increasingly distant over the course of the 1989 Tiananmen Square protests, and their marriage ended in divorce soon after the movement ended.

Protest and exile

Chai first became involved in the 1989 Tiananmen Square Protests through her work as a secretary for the Peking University Preparatory Committee, which had elected Chai's husband Feng into a leadership position. She rose to prominence as a student leader as a result of her involvement in the student hunger strike. Chai has stated that the idea for the hunger strike was given to her by Zhang Boli, another Beijing University student, but has also claimed that a member of the national security force informed her that a hunger strike would elicit a reaction from the government. On May 12, fellow demonstrator Wang Dan approached Chai and informed her that he planned to join the hunger strike, which at the time consisted of only forty members. Chai agreed to join as well, and that evening delivered a speech to the demonstrators that generated a large amount of support for the hunger strike movement, and enabled Chai to gather support from the student demonstrators and endorsement from the Beijing Students’ Autonomous Federation.

The growth of the hunger strike allowed Chai's influence over the student movement to grow. On May 13, she participated in a student dialogue with the government that was led by Yan Mingfu. Two days later, Chai was elected to serve as commander in chief of the Hunger Strike Committee, one of several student demonstration organizations in Tiananmen Square. On May 19, Chai announced the end of the hunger strike, a decision that was met with criticism from Feng Congde, Wang Wen, and groups of angry demonstrators. Chai and most other major hunger strike leaders went into hiding on May 21 in response to rumors of government troops invading the square that evening, but returned to the square the following day after hearing that no attack had occurred during the night. The retreat of the hunger strike leaders caused a power vacuum that was filled by the Beijing Students Autonomous Union, as well as new organizations which had been created. On May 23, the students of the square voted to transfer leadership from the Beijing Student's Federation to a temporary organization called the Defend Tiananmen Square Headquarters, which selected Chai Ling as its leader and made permanent the following day. During a May 27 meeting with other student leaders, Chai Ling and Feng Congde voted in favour of evacuating the square on May 30. At the press conference that same evening, however, Chai and Feng changed their positions and instead supported the continued occupation of the square. Chai claimed that the meeting had been part of plot to remove the students from the square and defended her change of opinion by stating that she had been pressured into voting to leave. Chai resigned from her role as commander in chief of Defend Tiananmen Square Headquarters on May 29, though she later resumed her position.

Like many of the student leaders during the demonstrations, Chai Ling was also a participant in some of the internal conflicts within the student movement. Chai was highly critical of the Beijing Students’ Autonomous Union. In response to losing control of the square while in hiding on the May 21, Chai criticized the rival leadership group of lacking "leadership quality," opposing the hunger strike and accomplishing nothing positive for the student movement. In an essay given to reporters in late May, Chai reiterated her role as "chief commander" of the square, while also stating that she refused to make compromises with the Autonomous Student Union of Non-Beijing Universities and other student factions. In this same essay, Chai accused Liu Xiaobo and others of using the student movement as a way to "rebuild their own images," criticized many participants in the movement for lacking belief, and stated that China's intellectuals and theorists were "lagging far behind" in their understanding of democracy. Chai was also an adamant supporter of the purity of the student movement and resisted both the participation of non-student protesters, and involvement in the political struggle between government reformers and hardliners. Unlike more moderate leaders within the movement, Chai Ling seemed willing to allow for the movement to end in a violent confrontation. In an interview given in late May, Chai suggested that only when the movement ended in bloodshed would the majority of Chinese realize the importance of the student movement and unite, though she felt that she was unable to share this idea with her fellow students. Chai has since claimed that these remarks were taken out of context and selectively edited. She has also stated that the expectation of violent crackdown was something she had heard from Li Lu and not an idea of her own.

When the violent government crackdown ended the demonstrations on the night of June 3, Feng and Chai escaped Beijing by train. The couple spent the next ten months in hiding, where they were aided by a network of organizations which aimed to help student dissidents. On June 8, Chai recorded a speech while she was in hiding at the Wuhan University which stated that she was alive and provided her account of the events of June 3 crackdown. In this recording, Chai stated that she witnessed at least twenty students and workers being massacred in the square, though she was unable to confirm the estimates of other witnesses. Chai was not alone in reporting seeing a massacre in the square. Wu’er Kaixi claimed to witness two hundred students massacred in spite of the fact that he had left hours before the military arrived at the square. Li Lu also stated that he witnessed tanks drive over tents full of sleeping protesters, killing hundreds of unarmed students. However, Hou Dejian claimed that despite being present until 6:30am on June 4, he did not witness anyone being killed in the square itself. On June 13, the Public Security Ministry issued an arrest warrant which listed the names of twenty-one student demonstrators in order of importance. Chai Ling's name was fourth on the list, behind Wang Dan, Wu’er Kaixi and Liu Gang. Eventually Chai and Feng were smuggled out of mainland China and into Hong Kong by boat. At the University of Hong Kong, Feng and Chai were put in contact with an underground rescue network that orchestrated their escape to France.

Post-Tiananmen
While in hiding, Chai was nominated by two Norwegian legislators for the 1990 Nobel Peace Prize. As a result of her role in the student demonstrations, Chai also received an invitation to attend Princeton University through the China Initiative Program, an organization which aimed to provide educational scholarships for student refugees. While at Princeton, Chai studied politics and international relations at the Woodrow Wilson School of Public and International Affairs.

After graduating from Princeton in 1993, Chai began working at the consulting firm Bain & Company. While working at Bain & Company, Chai began dating her current husband, Robert A. Maginn Jr., a partner at the firm. The couple married in 2001 and currently reside in the United States, where they have three daughters.

In 1998 Chai earned her M.B.A. from Harvard  and founded an Internet company called Jenzabar. Jenzabar provides ERP software to universities across the United States of America. She has been President since founding Jenzabar and Chief Operating Officer since 2001.

In 2009, Chai converted to Christianity. In June 2010, Chai Ling started a nonprofit called  "All Girls Allowed" with the aim of stopping the human rights violations related to the One-Child Policy.

Though Chai Ling was reportedly working on an autobiography as early as 1991, her autobiography, A Heart for Freedom: The Remarkable Journey of a Young Dissident, her Daring Escape, and her Quest to Free China's Daughters, was not published until 2011 .

Chai has been called to testify before the United States Congress 8 times, most recently on June 3, 2013. Her testimony has mainly related to Human Rights Issues in China.

Controversies

Documentary controversy
Footage from a documentary titled The Gate of Heavenly Peace shows viewers parts of an interview between Chai and reporter Philip Cunningham from May 28, 1989, a week prior to the 1989 Tiananmen Square protests and massacre. In the footage, Chai makes the following statements:

The footage has been verified by third-party media specialists as genuine, and is readily available online. Chai, however, claims that she had been misquoted and that the footage used "interpretive and erroneous translation". Although Chai later decided to remain with the students, declassified US embassy cables published on Wikileaks contradicted her later witness testimonial of experiencing a massacre in the square.

Chai and her firm have launched multiple lawsuits against the film's non-profit producers, the Long Bow Group. An initial suit, in which Chai alleged defamation, was summarily dismissed. An additional suit claimed that the organization infringed upon Jenzabar's trademark by mentioning the firm's name in the keyword meta tags and title tag for a page about Jenzabar on its website. Her lawsuits were subsequently criticized by some commentators, including columnists for the Boston Globe and the New Yorker. In the end, each of her legal actions against the film were dismissed by the Massachusetts appeals court. In its ruling the Superior Court handed an award to defendants of more than $500,000 in attorney fees and expenses, stating that Jenzabar "subjected Long Bow to protracted and costly litigation not to protect the goodwill of its trademark from misappropriation, but to suppress criticism of Jenzabar's principles and its corporate practices." in the ruling.

Religious discrimination lawsuit against Jenzabar, All Girls Allowed and Chai Ling
Jing Zhang, a Chinese feminist activist, sued Jenzabar Inc., The Jenzabar Foundation, All Girls Allowed and their founder and Jing's former employer, Chai Ling. Zhang had established her own nonprofit, Women’s Rights in China, when she joined forces with Chai to develop programs to prevent forced abortions in China. Then, she alleges, Chai fired her for being insufficiently religious and for declining to engage in "weekly corporate worship."

See also
 Women's roles during the 1989 Tiananmen Square protests and massacre

References

External links

 
 Garry Emmons: Chai Ling – The meaning of freedom (Harvard Business School)

1966 births
Living people
Chinese anti-communists
Chinese dissidents
Chinese democracy activists
Chinese human rights activists
Princeton University alumni
Harvard Business School alumni
1989 Tiananmen Square protesters
Beijing Normal University alumni
Peking University alumni
Converts to Christianity
Chinese Christians
People from Rizhao